Cosmarium tetragonum is a species of green algae in the family Desmidiaceae. It is a freshwater species with a worldwide distribution.

Description 
The nominate variety (var. tetragonum) is about 35 to 48 µm long, and 20 to 26 µm wide, 14 to 18 µm thick, with an isthmus about 6 to 12 µm long. Semicells are roughly rectangular in outline, with undulate margins; each side has about four bumps and the top side has about two bumps.

References

External links 
 Cosmarium tetragonum at AlgaeBase
 Cosmarium tetragonum var. elegans at AlgaeBase

Desmidiaceae
Plants described in 1861
Taxa named by William Archer (naturalist)